Clifford Manua (born 12 September 1980) is a New Zealand former rugby league footballer who played for the Melbourne Storm in the National Rugby League. He joined the Brisbane Broncos team in 2007, and played for their feeder club, the Aspley Broncos.

Background
Manua was born in Auckland, New Zealand.

Career
Manua made his first grade debut for Cronulla-Sutherland in round 24 of the 2005 NRL season against Manly-Warringah which ended in a 68-6 victory at Shark Park.  Manua played in the club's elimination final loss against St. George during the same year.

In the 2007 NRL season, Manua joined Brisbane.  He played four matches for the club including their 40-0 elimination final loss against Melbourne.  He was released by Brisbane in late 2007, to join defending premiers Melbourne Storm as a backup for some of their injured forwards.  Manua played a handful of games for Melbourne in the 2008 NRL season, the last of which was against the Gold Coast in round 13 with the match ending in a 18-0 defeat.

Career highlights 
Junior Club: St Johns JRLFC
Career Stats: 10 career games for Cronulla, Brisbane and Melbourne
Part of the Melbourne team that finished as 2008 NRL Grand Final runner-up.

Part of the Brisbane team that lost the 2007 World Club Challenge to St. Helens.

References

External links 
Clifford Manua Official Player Profile

1980 births
Living people
Brisbane Broncos players
Cronulla-Sutherland Sharks players
New Zealand rugby league players
New Zealand sportspeople of Samoan descent
Melbourne Storm players
Otara Scorpions players
Rugby league players from Auckland
Rugby league props